Procerodes is a genus of marine triclads. It is the only genus in the monotypic family Procerodidae and monotypic superfamily Procerodoidea .

Ecology
Although it is mainly a marine family, specimens living in freshwater have been reported, mainly from oceanic islands of the Southern Hemisphere.

Species
Procerodes anatolicus 
Procerodes australis 
Procerodes dahli 
Procerodes dohrni 
Procerodes lacteus 
Procerodes littoralis 
Procerodes lobatus 
Procerodes pacificus 
Procerodes plebeius 
Procerodes variabilis

References

Maricola